Simon II (219–199 BCE) was a Jewish High Priest during the Second Temple period. He was the son of Onias II. Some identify him with Simeon the Just.

Mentioned extensively by Jesus son of Eleazar, son of Sirach of Jerusalem, also known as Ben Sira, in chapter 50 of Ben Sira/Sirach in a hymn of Hebrew parallel verse: "The leader of his brothers and the pride of his people was the high priest, Simon son of Onias, who in his life repaired the house, and in his time fortified the temple. He laid the foundations for the high double walls, the high retaining walls for the temple enclosure. In his days a water cistern was dug, a reservoir like the sea in circumference. He considered how to save his people from ruin, and fortified the city against siege. How glorious he was, surrounded by the people, as he came out of the house of the curtain. Like the morning star upon the clouds, like the full moon at the festal season, like the sun shining on the temple of the Most High, like the rainbow gleaming in splendid clouds..." (Ben Sira/Sirach 50:1-7, NRSV translation ). The chapter continues to describe a festival led by the High Priest Simon II and the celebrations of the people of Jerusalem.

Ben Sira was a contemporary of Simon II, and this description of him comes after a long versified walk through the traditions and revered ancestors of the Jewish people. He is the last leader or ancestor mentioned, and clearly was highly revered by Ben Sira.

Simon is also mentioned in 3 Maccabees, chapter 2.

Patrilineal ancestry

References

 Josephus ("Antiquities") (xii. 4, § 10)
 

3rd-century BCE High Priests of Israel
2nd-century BCE High Priests of Israel